Maunabo is a town and municipality of Puerto Rico located in the Maunabo Valley on the southeastern coast, northeast of Patillas and south of Yabucoa. Maunabo is spread over eight barrios and Maunabo Pueblo (the downtown area and the administrative center of the city). It is part of the San Juan-Caguas-Guaynabo Metropolitan Statistical Area. The current mayor of the town is Jorge L. Márquez Pérez and the population in 2020 was 10,589.

History
Maunabo was founded in 1799. Maunabo derives its name from a Taino name Manatuabón for the Maunabo River.

Puerto Rico was ceded by Spain in the aftermath of the Spanish–American War under the terms of the Treaty of Paris of 1898 and became a territory of the United States. In 1899, the United States Department of War conducted a census of Puerto Rico finding that the population of Maunabo was 6,221.

Maunabo is known for its advances in media. Being almost "disconnected" from the rest of the island by its high mountains, the maunabeños created their own newspaper called La Esquina ("The Corner" in English) on August 30, 1975 by Ramón "Chito" Arroyo and José Orlando Rivera. It started as a community one-sheeter distributed free of charge only in Maunabo, but its popularity was so overwhelming that a year later it was transformed into a monthly tabloid. Today, the paper still is free of charge, home delivering 40,000 copies not only in Maunabo but also in the southeastern towns of Guayama, Arroyo, Patillas, Yabucoa and Humacao, and read by more than 190,000 people. Recently, the paper opened its new offices in Maunabo where they also work on La Esquina Online and other projects.

On September 20, 2017 Hurricane Maria struck Puerto Rico. The hurricane triggered numerous landslides in Maunabo with its 155 mph winds and rain.  The electric company (Autoridad de Energía Eléctrica) stated restoring power to Maunabo could take up to 9 months. The mayor said all small businesses were affected and all minor fruits were lost.

Geography 
Maunabo is surrounded by high mountains on two sides. The wind on these high points is so strong that it is hard to hear anything else but it blowing past your ears. At Sierra Guardarraya the strong winds have affected the growth of vegetation and the tall grass only grows flat to the ground.

In the lush and tropical vegetation of Cerro de la Pandura you will find one of the Island's most endangered species of coquí. Known as the coquí Guajón (Eleutherodactylus cooki), this coquí frog can be found in the mountains shared by the neighboring municipalities of Yabucoa, Patillas and San Lorenzo. Though discovered in 1932 by Chapman Grant of the U.S. Army, it was not until 1997 that the U.S. Fish and Wildlife Service declared it an endangered species.

Barrios

Like all municipalities of Puerto Rico, Maunabo is subdivided into barrios.

 Calzada
 Emajagua
 Lizas
 Matuyas Alto
 Matuyas Bajo
 Maunabo barrio-pueblo
 Palo Seco
 Quebrada Arenas
 Talante
 Tumbao

Sectors
Barrios (which are like minor civil divisions) and subbarrios, in turn, are further subdivided into smaller local populated place areas/units called sectores (sectors in English). The types of sectores may vary, from normally sector to urbanización to reparto to barriada to residencial, among others.

Special Communities

 (Special Communities of Puerto Rico) are marginalized communities whose citizens are experiencing a certain amount of social exclusion. A map shows these communities occur in nearly every municipality of the commonwealth. Of the 742 places that were on the list in 2014, the following barrios, communities, sectors, or neighborhoods were in Maunabo: Matuyas, Sector García in Talante, and Batey Columbia in Calzada.

Demographics

Tourism

With an almost unspoiled culture—due to the high mountains that separate the town from the rest—Maunabo still is a bucolic city and the lack of large commercial chains gives it a unique personality compared to the rest of the island.

The warm, unspoiled and untamed blue and green waters of the beaches of Maunabo are one of its major attractions. The three beaches (Los Bohios, Los Pinos and Playa Punta Tuna) are mostly visited by the locals all year round. The beaches also attract tourists that explore other regions beyond San Juan and other major cities. Surfers love these wild and dangerous waters. The Punta Tuna beach is also known by the locals as Playa Escondida or the "hidden beach", crowned by the Punta Tuna Lighthouse on one side and separated from the main road by lush sea grape trees on the other. The beach is only accessible by foot through a short dusty road.

The sand at Los Pinos Beach (the name means "the pines" and it comes from a pine-tree-lined hill on the side of the beach) shines with black carbon minerals and legend has it that these come from sea volcanoes or from underwater fossil fuel deposits. The minerals tend to stick to anything that is wet and thus it is rarely visited.

The Los Bohios Beach is another popular beach in the municipality, attracting thousands of visitors each year.

The town is also known for its Punta Tuna Lighthouse built by the Spanish at the end of the 19th century before the Island was turned over to the United States as spoils of the Spanish–American War of 1898. Though it has never ceased working under the active management of the U.S. Coast Guard, for almost 30 years the lighthouse was not accessible to the public. Due to Law 180 presented by Governor Aníbal Acevedo Vilá, the doors of the lighthouse were opened once again to the public in February 2006. The lighthouse is also a permanent symbol in the town's coat of arms.

The town is also known for its annual crab carnival "Festi-Carnaval Jueyero" which attracts thousands of visitors for a three-day celebration with live music, street fairs, contests and much crab-based food. The carnival is celebrated during the first week of September, at the peak of the summer heat.

Landmarks and places of interest

 Cantera Caverns
 Punta Tuna Light - built by the Spaniards in 1892 is located on Punta Tuna.
 Punta Tuna Beach
Sierra La Pandura

Culture

Festivals and events
Maunabo celebrates its patron saint festival in May. The  is a religious and cultural celebration that generally features parades, games, artisans, amusement rides, regional food, and live entertainment.

Other festivals and events celebrated in Maunabo include:
Gifts on the eve of Three Kings Day– January
Isidore, the Farmer Community Festival – May
Town Festival – June/July
Festival of Our Lady of Mount Carmel – July
Night Out – August
Land Crab Festival and Carnival – September
Christmas Party at Calle 3 (Palo Seco) – December
Aníbal Arroyo Cup (basketball event) – December
End of Year Marathon – December 31

Economy

Agriculture
 Fruits and vegetables; cattle.

Industry
 Fishing, guitar strings, plantain.

Government

Like all municipalities in Puerto Rico, Maunabo is administered by a mayor. The current mayor is Jorge L. Márquez Pérez, from the Popular Democratic Party (PPD). Márquez was elected at the 2000 general election.

The city belongs to the Puerto Rico Senatorial district VII, which is represented by two Senators. In 2012, Jorge Suárez and José Luis Dalmau were elected as District Senators.

Symbols
The  has an official flag and coat of arms.

Flag
Maunabo's flag consists of a green cloth crossed diagonally by a white stripe. In each corner of the two remaining green triangles, there are two yellow ox yokes.

Coat of arms
This municipality has a coat of arms. Silver and green are the main colors of the shield, representing flowered sugarcane.  The upside down V symbolizes the mountains of Maunabo: Sierra de Guarderraya and Sierra de la Pandura. A lighthouse is a representation of Maunabo's oldest building, which is located on the Maunabo coast. The yokes are symbols of agriculture and Maunabo's patron saint, San Isidro Labrador.

Transportation 

The town constructed a tunnel which goes under a mountain, in this case, the eastern side mountains, (there is a vehicular tunnel that was built previously, in San Juan, the Minillas Tunnel, but that one goes under some buildings instead) connecting it with the neighboring town of Yabucoa. A Chilean construction company is in charge of the contract. The tunnels have been named Vicente Morales Lebrón, after an environmental activist who, as a result of the 1956 tropical storm Betsy that damaged the only road that connected the town with the north side of the island, proposed the tunnels to be built. In September 2018, the tunnel was closed briefly for the filming of a music video.

There are 22 bridges in Maunabo.

Gallery

See also

 List of Puerto Ricans
 History of Puerto Rico
 Did you know-Puerto Rico?

References

Further reading

External links 
 Puerto Rico Government Directory - Maunabo

 
Municipalities of Puerto Rico
Populated places established in 1799
San Juan–Caguas–Guaynabo metropolitan area
1799 establishments in the Spanish Empire
1799 establishments in North America